Dinotefuran is an insecticide of the neonicotinoid class developed by Mitsui Chemicals for control of insect pests such as aphids, whiteflies, thrips, leafhoppers, leafminers, sawflies, mole cricket, white grubs, lacebugs, billbugs, beetles, mealybugs, and cockroaches on leafy vegetables, in residential and commercial buildings, and for professional turf management.  Its mechanism of action involves disruption of the insect's nervous system by inhibiting nicotinic acetylcholine receptors. In order to avoid harming beneficial insects such as bees, it should not be applied during bloom. 

In July 2013, the state of Oregon temporarily restricted the use of dinotefuran pending the results of an investigation into a large bee kill.

Dinotefuran is also used in veterinary medicine as a flea and tick preventive for dogs and as a flea preventive for cats. It is used in combination with pyriproxifen or permethrin.

Current studies show dinotefuran is effective at controlling the invasive Spotted lanternfly, first found in Berks County, PA, in 2014.

References

Insecticides
Nitroguanidines
Veterinary drugs
Neonicotinoids